Twilight Peaks is the fourteenth and final studio album by composer and guitarist Robbie Basho, released independently in 1984 by Basho Productions.

Track listing

Personnel
Adapted from the Twilight Peaks liner notes.
 Robbie Basho – acoustic guitar, acoustic twelve-string guitar

Release history

References

External links 
 

1984 albums
Robbie Basho albums